The Building at 1316 Maple Avenue is a historic apartment building at 1316 Maple Avenue in Evanston, Illinois. The three-story cream brick building was built in 1928. Architect Edward M. Sieja designed the building in the Tudor Revival style. The building's design includes limestone quoins, projecting bays, casement windows, and a parapet at the roof. The building's lobby features wooden ceiling beams and a mosaic tile floor, giving it the appearance of a castle's great hall.

The building was added to the National Register of Historic Places on March 15, 1984.

References

Buildings and structures on the National Register of Historic Places in Cook County, Illinois
Residential buildings on the National Register of Historic Places in Illinois
Buildings and structures in Evanston, Illinois
Apartment buildings in Illinois
Tudor Revival architecture in Illinois
Residential buildings completed in 1928